Brooke Sweat (born Brooke Youngquist; March 27, 1986) is an American professional beach volleyball player, specializing as a defender. She started her career in 2007 with the AVP tours. Sweat had her best ever international (FIVB) finish with her then-partner Jennifer Fopma, when they placed third at the 2013 Berlin Grand Slam.

Personal

Sweat graduated from Florida Gulf Coast University. She is married to fellow AVP player, Nicholas Sweat.

Professional career

Rio de Janeiro 2016

She qualified for the 2016 Olympics in Rio with partner Lauren Fendrick. The pair played in Pool-A against Poland's Brzostek/Kolosinska (1-2), Brazil's Larissa/Talita (0-2), and Russia's Birlova/Ukolova (1-2), finishing in last place (0-3).

References

External links
 
 
 
 

1986 births
Living people
People from Hermosa Beach, California
Sportspeople from Fort Myers, Florida
American women's beach volleyball players
21st-century American women
Beach volleyball defenders
Beach volleyball players at the 2016 Summer Olympics
Florida Gulf Coast Eagles athletes
Florida Gulf Coast University alumni
Olympic beach volleyball players of the United States